Mais do Mesmo is the second compilation album by Brazilian rock band Legião Urbana. It was released in 1998, two years after vocalist, acoustic guitarist and keyboardist Renato Russo's death and the subsequent end of the band. All songs were extracted from all eight albums of the group, under Marcelo Bonfá's and Dado Villa-Lobos' choices. In Brazil, over a million copis were sold and the album was subsequently certified Diamond by ABPD.

It's the band's first de facto compilation, since the previous one, Música P/ Acampamentos, consisted almost entirely of live recordings. The art project was done by Barrão and Fernanda Villa-Lobos. Mais do Mesmo was the original planned name of their third album, which was ultimately released as Que País É Este.

In the CD booklet, there is a text by journalist and Russo's friend Arthur Dapieve, in which he defines Legião Urbana albums as: "the political Legião Urbana, the lovely Dois, the angry Que País É Este 1978/1987, the religious As Quatro Estações, the shadowy V, the depressed A Tempestade and the redeemer Uma Outra Estação".

Track listing

Personnel
 Renato Russo - lead vocals, bass guitar, acoustic guitar, keyboards
 Dado Villa-Lobos - guitar, acoustic guitar, bass guitar
 Marcelo Bonfá - drums
 Renato Rocha - bass guitar on tracks 1-8

References

 

1998 compilation albums
Legião Urbana albums